Robert G. Schwemm is an American lawyer and currently the Ashland-Spears Distinguished Research Professor of Law and William L. Matthews, Jr. Professor of Law at the College of Law, University of Kentucky, and also a published author. From 1998-99, he was also the college's Acting Dean.

References

American lawyers
University of Kentucky faculty
American legal writers
Amherst College alumni
Harvard Law School alumni
Year of birth missing (living people)
Living people